The 100 metres, or 100-meter dash, is a sprint race in track and field competitions. The shortest common outdoor running distance, the  dash is one of the most popular and prestigious events in the sport of athletics. It has been contested at the Summer Olympics since 1896 for men and since 1928 for women. The inaugural World Championships were in 1983.

The reigning 100 m Olympic or world champion is often named "the fastest man or woman in the world". Fred Kerley and Shelly-Ann Fraser-Pryce are the reigning world champions; Marcell Jacobs and Elaine Thompson-Herah are the men's and women's Olympic champions.

On an outdoor 400-metre running track, the 100 m is held on the home straight, with the start usually being set on an extension to make it a straight-line race. There are three instructions given to the runners immediately before and at the beginning of the race: "on your marks," "set," and the firing of the starter's pistol. The runners move to the starting blocks when they hear the 'on your marks' instruction. The following instruction, to adopt the 'set' position, allows them to adopt a more efficient starting posture and isometrically preload their muscles: this will help them to start faster. A race-official then fires the starter's pistol to signal the race beginning and the sprinters stride forwards from the blocks. Sprinters typically reach top speed after somewhere between 50 and 60 m. Their speed then slows towards the finish line.

The 10-second barrier has historically been a barometer of fast men's performances, while the best female sprinters take eleven seconds or less to complete the race. The current men's world record is 9.58 seconds, set by Jamaica's Usain Bolt in 2009, while the women's world record of 10.49 seconds set by American Florence Griffith-Joyner in 1988 remains unbroken.

Race dynamics

Start

At the start, some athletes play psychological games such as trying to be last to the starting blocks.

At high level meets, the time between the gun and first kick against the starting block is measured electronically, via sensors built in the gun and the blocks. A reaction time less than 0.1 s is considered a false start. The 0.2-second interval accounts for the sum of the time it takes for the sound of the starter's pistol to reach the runners' ears, and the time they take to react to it.

For many years a sprinter was disqualified if responsible for two false starts individually. However, this rule allowed some major races to be restarted so many times that the sprinters started to lose focus. The next iteration of the rule, introduced in February 2003, meant that one false start was allowed among the field, but anyone responsible for a subsequent false start was disqualified.

This rule led to some sprinters deliberately false-starting to gain a psychological advantage: an individual with a slower reaction time might false-start, forcing the faster starters to wait and be sure of hearing the gun for the subsequent start, thereby losing some of their advantage. To avoid such abuse and to improve spectator enjoyment, the IAAF implemented a further change in the 2010 season – a false starting athlete now receives immediate disqualification. This proposal was met with objections when first raised in 2005, on the grounds that it would not leave any room for innocent mistakes. Justin Gatlin commented, "Just a flinch or a leg cramp could cost you a year's worth of work." The rule had a dramatic impact at the 2011 World Championships, when current world record holder Usain Bolt was disqualified.

Mid-race
Runners usually reach their top speed just past the halfway point of the race and progressively decelerate to the finish. Maintaining that top speed for as long as possible is a primary focus of training for the 100 m. Pacing and running tactics do not play a significant role in the 100 m, as success in the event depends more on pure athletic qualities and technique.

Finish
The winner, by IAAF Competition Rules, is determined by the first athlete with their torso (not including limbs, head, or neck) over the nearer edge of the finish line. There is therefore no requirement for the entire body to cross the finish line. When the placing of the athletes is not obvious, a photo finish is used to distinguish which runner was first to cross the line.

Climatic conditions

Climatic conditions, in particular air resistance, can affect performances in the 100 m. A strong head wind is very detrimental to performance, while a tail wind can improve performances significantly. For this reason, a maximum tail wind of 2.0 m/s is allowed for a 100 m performance to be considered eligible for records, or "wind legal".

Furthermore, sprint athletes perform a better run at high altitudes because of the thinner air, which provides less air resistance. In theory, the thinner air would also make breathing slightly more difficult (due to the partial pressure of oxygen being lower), but this difference is negligible for sprint distances where all the oxygen needed for the short dash is already in the muscles and bloodstream when the race starts. While there are no limitations on altitude, performances made at altitudes greater than 1000 m above sea level are marked with an "A".

10-second barrier

The 10-second mark had been widely considered a barrier for the 100 metres in men's sprinting. The first man to break the 10 second barrier with automatic timing was Jim Hines at the 1968 Summer Olympics. Since then, numerous sprinters have run faster than 10 seconds.

Ethnicity

Only male sprinters have beaten the 100 m 10-second barrier, the vast majority of them being of West African descent. Namibian (formerly South-West Africa) Frankie Fredericks became the first man of non-West African heritage to achieve the feat in 1991 and in 2003 Australia's Patrick Johnson (an Indigenous Australian with Irish heritage) became the first sub-10-second runner without an African background.

In 2010, French sprinter Christophe Lemaitre became the first Caucasian to break the 10-second barrier. In 2017, Azerbaijani-born naturalized Turkish Ramil Guliyev followed and in 2018, Filippo Tortu became the first Italian to run under 10s. 

In the Prefontaine Classic 2015 Diamond League meet at Eugene, Su Bingtian of China ran a time of 9.99 seconds, becoming the first East Asian athlete to officially break the 10-second barrier. Subsequently, Chinese sprinter Xie Zhenye ran 9.97 on June 19, 2018. On 1 August 2021, Su improved his Asian record at the Olympic semifinal in Tokyo with a time of 9.83. On 9 September 2017, Yoshihide Kiryū became the first man from Japan to break the 10-second barrier in the 100 metres, running a 9.98 (+1.8) at an intercollegiate meet in Fukui. Kiryu's Japanese teammates Yuki Koike followed suite and ran 9.98 on july 20, 2019, andRyota Yamagata ran 9.95 on June 6, 2021.

British sprinter Adam Gemili, an athlete with an Iranian-Moroccan ethnic background, became the first sprinter of Middle-Eastern and North African ancestry to legally break the barrier on 7 June 2015, having done so earlier in the same season with an excessive wind reading.

On 3 July 2022, Yupun Abeykoon became the first Sri Lankan as well as first South Asian sprinter in history ever to break 10 second barrier when he won the Resisprint International 2022 title in Switzerland. Yupun's achievement also meant Sri Lanka became the 32nd country in the world to have a sub-10 sprinter and Yupun also became the 167th member of the sub-10 club.

Record performances
Major 100 m races, such as at the Olympic Games, attract much attention, particularly when the world record is thought to be within reach.

The men's world record has been improved upon twelve times since electronic timing became mandatory in 1977. The current men's world record of 9.58 s is held by Usain Bolt of Jamaica, set at the 2009 World Athletics Championships final in Berlin, Germany on 16 August 2009, breaking his own previous world record by 0.11 s. The current women's world record of 10.49 s was set by Florence Griffith-Joyner of the US, at the 1988 United States Olympic Trials in Indianapolis, Indiana, on 16 July 1988 breaking Evelyn Ashford's four-year-old world record by .27 seconds. The extraordinary nature of this result and those of several other sprinters in this race raised the possibility of a technical malfunction with the wind gauge which read at 0.0 m/s- a reading which was at complete odds to the windy conditions on the day with high wind speeds being recorded in all other sprints before and after this race as well as the parallel long jump runway at the time of the Griffith-Joyner performance. All scientific studies commissioned by the IAAF and independent organisations since have confirmed there was certainly an illegal tailwind of between 5 m/s – 7 m/s at the time. This should have annulled the legality of this result, although the IAAF has chosen not to take this course of action. The legitimate next best wind legal performance would therefore be Griffith-Joyner's 10.61s performance in the final the next day.

Some records have been marred by prohibited drug use – in particular, the scandal at the 1988 Summer Olympics when the winner, Canadian Ben Johnson was stripped of his medal and world record.

Jim Hines, Ronnie Ray Smith and Charles Greene were the first to break the 10-second barrier in the 100 m, all on 20 June 1968, the Night of Speed. Hines also recorded the first legal electronically timed sub-10 second 100 m in winning the 100 metres at the 1968 Olympics. Bob Hayes ran a wind-assisted 9.91 seconds at the 1964 Olympics.

Continental records
Updated 16 July 2022

Notes

 Represents a time set at a high altitude.

All-time top 25 men

Assisted marks
Any performance with a following wind of more than 2.0 metres per second is not counted for record purposes. Below is a list of wind-assisted times (equal or superior to 9.80). Only times that are superior to legal bests are shown:
Justin Gatlin ran 9.45 (+20 m/s) in 2011 on the Japanese TV show Kasupe! assisted by wind machines blowing at speeds over 25 metres per second. Due to the nature of the performance, World Athletics has not recognized it as a legitimate clocking.
Tyson Gay (USA) ran 9.68 (+4.1 m/s) during the U.S. Olympic Trials in Eugene, Oregon on 29 June 2008.
Obadele Thompson (BAR) ran 9.69 (+5.7 m/s) at high altitude in El Paso, Texas on 13 April 1996, which stood as the fastest ever 100 metres time for 12 years.
Andre De Grasse (CAN) ran 9.69 (+4.8 m/s) during the Diamond League in Stockholm on 18 June 2017, 9.74 (+2.9 m/s) during the Diamond League in Eugene, Oregon on 21 August 2021, and 9.75 (+2.7 m/s) during the NCAA Outdoor Track and Field Championships in Eugene, Oregon on 12 June 2015.
Richard Thompson (TTO) ran 9.74 (exact wind unknown) in Clermont, Florida on 31 May 2014.
Darvis Patton (USA) ran 9.75 (+4.3 m/s) in Austin, Texas on 30 March 2013.
Trayvon Bromell (USA) ran 9.75 (+2.1 m/s) in Jacksonville, Florida on 30 April 2022, 9.76 (+3.7 m/s) in Eugene, Oregon on 26 June 2015, and 9.77 (+4.2 m/s) in Lubbock, Texas on 18 May 2014.
Churandy Martina (AHO) ran 9.76 (+6.1 m/s) at high altitude in El Paso, Texas on 13 May 2006.
Carl Lewis (USA) ran 9.78 (+5.2 m/s) during the U.S. Olympic Trials in Indianapolis on 16 July 1988 and 9.80 (+4.3 m/s) during the World Championships in Tokyo on 24 August 1991.
Maurice Greene (USA) ran 9.78 (+3.7 m/s) in Eugene, Oregon on 31 May 2004.
Ronnie Baker (USA) ran 9.78 (+2.4 m/s) during the Diamond League in Eugene, Oregon on 26 May 2018.
Fred Kerley (USA) ran 9.78 (+2.9 m/s) during the Diamond League in Eugene, Oregon on 21 August 2021. 
Andre Cason (USA) ran 9.79 (+5.3 m/s) and (+4.5 m/s) in Eugene, Oregon on 16 June 1993.
Favour Ashe (NGR) ran 9.79 (+3.0 m/s) in Baton Rouge, Louisiana on 30 April 2022.
Walter Dix (USA) ran 9.80 (+4.1 m/s) during the U.S. Olympic Trials in Eugene, Oregon on 29 June 2008.
Mike Rodgers (USA) ran 9.80 (+2.7 m/s) in Eugene, Oregon on 31 May 2014 and 9.80 (+2.4 m/s) in Sacramento, California on 27 June 2014.
Terrance Laird (USA) ran 9.80 (+3.2 m/s) in College Station, Texas on 15 May 2021.
 Marvin Bracy (USA) ran 9.80 (+2.9 m/s) in Montverde, Florida on 4 June 2022.

Annulled marks
Tim Montgomery ran 9.78 (+2.0 m/s) in Paris on 14 September 2002, which was at the time ratified as a world record. However, the record was rescinded in December 2005 following his indictment in the BALCO scandal on drug use and drug trafficking charges. The time had stood as the world record until Asafa Powell first ran 9.77.
Ben Johnson ran 9.79 (+1.1 m/s) at the Olympics in Seoul on 24 September 1988, but he was disqualified after he tested positive for stanozolol after the race. He subsequently admitted to drug use between 1981 and 1988, and his time of 9.83 (+1.0 m/s) at the World Championships in Rome on 30 August 1987 was rescinded.

All-time top 25 women

Assisted marks
Any performance with a following wind of more than 2.0 metres per second is not counted for record purposes. Below is a list of wind-assisted times (equal or superior to 10.81). Only times that are superior to legal bests are shown:
Assuming that the 10.49 run by Florence Griffith-Joyner was aided by a +6.0 m/s tailwind, her personal best is 10.61, she also ran 10.54 (+3.0 m/s) on 25 September 1988 at the Olympic Games and 10.60 (+3.2 m/s) during the U.S. Olympic Trials in Indianapolis on 16 July 1988.
Blessing Okagbare (NGR) ran 10.63 (+2.7 m/s) in Lagos on 17 June 2021, 10.72 (+2.7 m/s) in Austin, Texas on 31 March 2018 and 10.75 (+2.2 m/s) in Eugene, Oregon on 1 June 2013.
Brittany Brown (USA) ran 10.66 (+3.2 m/s) during the Michael Johnson Invitational in Waco, Texas on 24 April 2022.
Melissa Jefferson (USA) ran 10.69 (+2.9 m/s) during the USA Outdoor Track and Field Championships in Eugene, Oregon on 24 June 2022.
Tori Bowie (USA) ran 10.72 (+3.2 m/s) during the USA Outdoor Track and Field Championships in Eugene, Oregon on 26 June 2015 and 10.74 (+3.1 m/s) during the U.S. Olympic Trials in Eugene, Oregon on 3 July 2016.
Tawanna Meadows (USA) ran 10.72 (+4.5 m/s) in Lubbock, Texas on 6 May 2017.
Aleia Hobbs (USA) ran 10.72 (+2.9 m/s) during the USA Outdoor Track and Field Championships in Eugene, Oregon on 24 June 2022, 10.80 (+3.3 m/s) during the Mt. SAC Relays in Walnut, California on 16 April 2022. 
 Cambrea Sturgis ran 10.74 (+2.2 m/s) in Eugene, Oregon on 12 June 2021.
Twanisha Terry (USA) ran 10.74 (+2.9 m/s) during the USA Outdoor Track and Field Championships in Eugene, Oregon on 24 June 2022, 10.77 (+3.3 m/s) during the Mt. SAC Relays in Walnut, California on 16 April 2022, and 10.79 (+2.2 m/s) in Eugene, Oregon on 12 June 2021.
Jenna Prandini (USA) ran 10.75 (+4.3 m/s) in Montverde, Florida on 4 June 2022 and 10.81 (+3.6 m/s) during the U.S. Olympic Trials in Eugene, Oregon on 2 July 2016.
Marshevet Hooker (USA) ran 10.76 (+3.4 m/s) during the U.S. Olympic Trials in Eugene, Oregon on 27 June 2008.
Gail Devers (USA) ran 10.77 (+2.3 m/s) in San Jose, California on 28 May 1994.
Ekaterini Thanou (GRE) ran 10.77 (+2.3 m/s) in Rethymno on 29 May 1999.
Gwen Torrence (USA) ran 10.78 (+5.0 m/s) during the U.S. Olympic Trials in Indianapolis on 16 July 1988.
Muna Lee (USA) ran 10.78 (+3.3 m/s) in Eugene, Oregon on 26 June 2009.
Tamari Davis ran 10.78 (+2.9 m/s) during the USA Outdoor Track and Field Championships in Eugene, Oregon on 24 June 2022,
Marlies Göhr (GDR) ran 10.79 (+3.3 m/s) in Cottbus on 16 July 1980.
Pam Marshall (USA) ran 10.80 (+2.9 m/s) in Eugene, Oregon on 20 June 1986.
Daryll Neita (GB) ran 10.80 (+3.8 m/s) in Manchester, UK on 25 June 2022.
Gabrielle Thomas (USA) ran 10.80 (+3.2 m/s) during the Michael Johnson Invitational in Waco, Texas on 24 April 2022.
Heike Drechsler (GDR) ran 10.80 (+2.8 m/s) in Oslo on 5 July 1986.
Tamara Clark (USA) ran 10.81 (+3.2 m/s) during the Michael Johnson Invitational in Waco, Texas on 24 April 2022 and 10.82 (+2.9 m/s) during the USA Outdoor Track and Field Championships in Eugene, Oregon on 24 June 2022,

Notes:
Sha'Carri Richardson ran 10.64 (+2.6 m/s) at the US Olympic trials in Eugene, Oregon on 19 June 2021, but her result was later nullified due to a positive test for cannabis.
Kelli White (USA) ran 10.79 (+2.3 m/s) in Carson, California on 1 June 2001. This performance was annulled in 2003 after she tested positive for modafinil.

Season's bests

Men

Women

Top 25 junior (under-20) men

Notes

Trayvon Bromell's junior world record is also the age-18 world record. He also recorded the fastest wind-assisted (+4.2 m/s) time for a junior or age-18 athlete of 9.77 seconds on 18 May 2014 (age ).
Yoshihide Kiryu's time of 10.01 seconds matched the junior world record set by Darrel Brown and Jeff Demps, but was not ratified because of the type of wind gauge used.
British sprinter Mark Lewis-Francis recorded a time of 9.97 seconds on 4 August 2001 (age ), but the wind gauge malfunctioned.
Nigerian sprinter Davidson Ezinwa recorded a time of 10.05 seconds on 4 January 1990 (age ), but with no wind gauge.
Below is a list of all other legal times equal or superior to 10.06:
Letsile Tebogo also ran 9.94 (2022), 9.96 (2022).
Trayvon Bromell also ran 10.01 (2014), 10.02 (2014), 10.07 (2014).
Yoshihide Kiryu also ran 10.05 (2014).
Adam Gemili also ran 10.06 (2012).
Abdul Hakim Sani Brown also ran 10.06 (2×2017).

Top 24 junior (under-20) women

Notes

Briana Williams ran 10.94 s at the Jamaican Championships on 21 June 2019, which would have made her the fourth fastest junior female of all-time. However, she tested positive for the banned diuretic hydrochlorothiazide during the competition. She was determined to be not at fault and received no period of ineligibility to compete, but her results from the Jamaican Championships were nullified.
Below is a list of all other legal times equal or superior to 11.11:
Tamari Davis also ran 10.91 (2022).
Tina Clayton also ran 10.96 (2022), 11.09 (2021)
Briana Williams also ran 10.98 (2021), 11.00 (2021), 11.01 (2021), 11.02 (2019, 2021), 11.09 (2021), 11.10 (2019) and 11.11 (2019).
Sha'Carri Richardson also ran 10.99 (2×2019).
Twanisha Terry also ran 11.03 (2018) and 11.08 (2018).
Marlies Gohr also ran 11.07 (1977) and 11.10 (1977).
Candace Hill also ran 11.07 (2016), 11.08 (2015) and 11.09 (2016).
Silke Gladisch-Moeller also ran 11.08 (1983).
Bianca Knight also ran 11.09 (2008) and 11.11 (2×2008).
Ángela Tenorio also ran 11.09 (2×2015) and 11.10 (2015).
Tina Clayton also ran 11.09 (2021).
Angela Williams (USA) also ran 11.11 (1998).
Kiara Grant also ran 11.11 (2019).

Top 22 Youth (under-18) boys

Notes
Below is a list of all other legal times equal or superior to 10.20:
Puripol Boonson also ran 10.12 (2022), 10.20 (2022).

Top 17 Youth (under-18) girls

Notes
Briana Williams ran 10.94 s at the Jamaican Championships on 21 June 2019, which would have been a world under-18 best time. However, she tested positive for the banned diuretic hydrochlorothiazide during the competition. She was determined to be not at fault and received no period of ineligibility to compete, but her results from the Jamaican Championships were nullified.

Below is a list of all other legal times equal or superior to 11.24:
Briana Williams also ran 11.10 (2019), 11.11 (2019), 11.13 (2018), 11.21 (2018).
Tamari Davis also ran 11.15 (2020).
Tina Clayton also ran 11.17.
Kevona Davis also ran 11.24 (2017).

100 metres per age category 

The best performances by 5- to 19-year-old athletes

Boys

Girls

Para world records men

Updated September 2022

Para world records women
Updated June 2022

Olympic medalists

Men

Women

World Championships medalists

Men

Women

See also
 100-yard dash
 List of 100 metres national champions (men)
 List of 100 metres national champions (women)
 Men's 100 metres world record progression
 Women's 100 metres world record progression
 2018 in 100 metres
 2019 in 100 metres
 2020 in 100 metres

Notes

References

External links

IAAF list of 100-metres records in XML
All-time men's 100 m list
All-time women's 100 m list
Olympics 100 m – Men
Olympics 100 m – Women

 
Events in track and field
Sprint (running)
Summer Olympic disciplines in athletics
Articles containing video clips